Robot Wars may refer to:

Film and television
 Robot Wars (film), 1993 
 Robot Wars (soundtrack)
 Robot Wars (TV series), a British TV competition, 1998–2004 and 2016–2018
 Nickelodeon Robot Wars, a U.S. TV game show spin-off, 2002
 "Robot Wars", an episode of Zoey 101

Gaming
 Robot Wars: Metal Mayhem, 2000
 Robot Wars: Arenas of Destruction, 2001 
 Robot Wars: Advanced Destruction, 2001
 Robot Wars: Extreme Destruction, 2002

Literature
 The Robot Wars, a Judge Dredd storyline
 Robot Wars (book series), a rerelease of Mars Diaries by Sigmund Brouwer

See also

 Robot combat, a mode of robot competition i
 RobotWar, a 1981 programming game 
 Military robot, designed for military applications
 Super Robot Wars, a video game series
 War Robots, a 2014 video game